Pterotrichina is a genus of ground spiders that was first described by R. de Dalmas in 1921.  it contains only two species: P. elegans and P. nova.

References

Araneomorphae genera
Gnaphosidae
Spiders of Africa
Spiders of Asia